Spinning Around the Sun is an album by country music singer-songwriter Jimmie Dale Gilmore.  It was released in 1993 on Elektra Records, and was his second record for the label.

The album includes a duet with singer-songwriter Lucinda Williams, "Reunion."

Critical reception
In The Village Voices annual Pazz & Jop critics' poll for the year's best albums, Spinning Around the Sun finished at number 7.

Robert Christgau gave the album an A grade, writing: "I doubt I'll hear a more gorgeous country record--maybe a more gorgeous record--anytime soon." Mark Deming from AllMusic gave the record a 3.5-star rating, writing that "there are too many tunes that are beautiful but unremarkable, and beyond a near-definitive reworking of Butch Hancock's 'Just a Wave, Not the Water,' very little of this connects with the force of Gilmore's best work." The Orlando Sentinel wrote that "Gilmore's synthesis of country, folk and rock 'n' roll is as effortless as ever, and his voice is its old sweet, nasal self."

Track listing
"Where You Going" (Jimmie Dale Gilmore, David Hammond) 4:21
"Santa Fe Thief" (A. B. Strehli, Jr.) 5:00
"I Was the One" (Hal Blair, Claude Demetrius, Bill Peppers, Aaron Schroeder) 3:15
"So I'll Run" (Strehli) 3:50
"I'm So Lonesome I Could Cry" (Hank Williams) 3:38
"Mobile Line" (Traditional) 3:43
"Nothing of the Kind" (Butch Hancock) 3:19
"Just a Wave, Not the Water" (Hancock) 4:02
"Reunion" (Jo Carol Pierce, Harry Porter) 2:54
with Lucinda Williams
"I'm Gonna Love You" (Gilmore) 3:46
"Another Colorado" (Gilmore) 3:31
"Thinking About You" (Gilmore) 3:17

Personnel
Jimmie Dale Gilmore - vocals, guitar
Wes Starr, Harry Stinson - drums
Emory Gordy, Jr. - bass
Richard Bennett, James Burton, Steve Gibson, Chris Leuzinger, Gary Nicholson, Biff Watson - guitar
Steve Fishell, Paul Franklin, Kayton Roberts - steel guitar
Glen D. Hardin, Pete Wasner - keyboards, piano
Glen Duncan, Stuart Duncan - fiddle, mandolin
Al Perkins - dobro
Joe Ely, Carmella Ramsey, Harry Stinson - backing vocals

Production
Produced By Emory Gordy, Jr.
Engineers: Russ Martin
Assistant Engineers: Terry Bates, Marc Frigo, Amy Hughes
Mixing: Steve Tillisch

Chart performance

References

1993 albums
Jimmie Dale Gilmore albums
Albums produced by Emory Gordy Jr.
Elektra Records albums